Ademar Arthur Chioro dos Reis (born 5 December 1963) is a Brazilian physician, university professor, and politician affiliated with the Workers Party. From February 2014 to October 2015 he served as the minister of health in the government of Dilma Rousseff.

Personal life
He graduated in medicine from the Central University of Serra dos Órgãos (UniFESO), performed a medical residency in Preventive and Social Medicine at the Botucatu Medical School, and obtained a master's degree from the State University of Campinas and a doctorate from the Federal University of São Paulo, both in collective health. Chioro identifies religiously as a spiritualists. Before he was appointed minister of health, Chioro was the secretary of health for the municipality of São Bernardo do Campo.

Political career
Chioro was appointed to the role of Minister of Health on 3 February 2014, but on 21 February he was exonerated from the position of Minister of Health to take up the position of professor at Federal University of São Paulo. The procedure was part of a bureaucratic procedure, since he could not take office as a teacher already in a public position, however, as a teacher, he can accumulate the position of minister. Hence, Chioro's appointment as health minister took place after taking office as a teacher. The Secretary of Labor and Health Education Management, Mozart Sales, took over on an interim basis.

On December 31, 2014, his tenure in charge of the ministry was confirmed for the after the reelection of Dilma Rousseff, where he remained until September 29, 2015.

References

1963 births
Living people
Health ministers of Brazil
São Paulo (state) politicians
People from Santos, São Paulo
Workers' Party (Brazil) politicians
Brazilian public health doctors
Brazilian educators
Brazilian spiritualists
State University of Campinas alumni
Federal University of São Paulo alumni